Drupadia hayashii  
is a butterfly of the family Lycaenidae. It is found in the Philippines (Tawi Tawi-Province, Sibutu Island). Forewing length:11-15mm. It is rare and very localized Drupadia so far found only on Sibutu Island in small clearings in secondary forest. Normally they are seldom seen in flight and it is necessary to create movement amongst the bushes and lowest branches of trees in such a clearing in order to disturb these butterflies. Both the male and female are very small and have a weak flight, so it is no surprising that they seldom fly more than 3 to 5 meters before they settle on a leaf and then often crawl under it. Since most of the secondary forest on this island has either been cut down or burnt, it is possible that this species is either close to extinction or perhaps already extinct.

References
 Schrőder,Heinz & Treadaway Colin G.,1989: Zur Kenntnis Philippinischer Lycaenidae, 5(Lepidoptera). Ent. Z.. 99(19): 273-275. 
 Treadaway, Colin G., 1995: Checklist of the butterflies of the Philippine Islands. Nachr. entomol. Ver. Apollo, Suppl. 14: 7-118.
 Treadaway, Colin G. & Schrőder,Heinz,2012: Revised checklist of the butterflies of the Philippine Islands. Nachr. entomol. Ver. Apollo, Suppl. 20: 1-64.

hayashii
Lepidoptera of the Philippines
Butterflies described in 1989